Latrobe High School is a government co-educational comprehensive secondary school located in , Tasmania, Australia. Established in 1964, the school caters for approximately 500 students from Years 7 to 12. The school is administered by the Tasmanian Department of Education.

In 2019 student enrolments were 484. The school principal is Brent Armitstead.

History 
Latrobe High School was formed when the then Latrobe School separated into the Latrobe High School and Latrobe Primary School. The high school opened on 4 February 1964 with an initial enrolment of 263 students. The school had not been completed, only nine rooms and a shelter area were available to staff and students at the time.

In 2015 the Latrobe High School underwent a major refurbishment.

See also 
 List of schools in Tasmania
 Education in Tasmania

References

External links 
 Latrobe High School website

Public high schools in Tasmania
Educational institutions established in 1964
1964 establishments in Australia